Craugastor azueroensis is a species of frog in the family Craugastoridae.
It is endemic to Panama's Azuero Peninsula.

Its natural habitats are subtropical or tropical dry forests, subtropical or tropical moist montane forests, and rivers between 60 and 940 meters elevation. Its estimated extent of occurrence (EOO) is 2,213 km2, which represents two threat-defined locations.

It is threatened by habitat loss.

References

Sources

azueroensis
Amphibians of Panama
Endemic fauna of Panama
Frogs of North America
Endangered fauna of North America
Amphibians described in 1975
Isthmian–Pacific moist forests
Taxonomy articles created by Polbot